Degana Junction railway station is a railway station in Nagaur district, Rajasthan. Its code is DNA. It serves Degana town. The station consists of four platforms. Passenger, Express, and Superfast trains halt here.

Trains

The following trains halt at Degana Junction railway station in both directions:

 Kota–Shri Ganganagar Superfast Express
 Pratap Express
 Malani Express
 Bandra Terminus–Jammu Tawi Vivek Express
 Bhagat Ki Kothi–Bilaspur Express
 Bilaspur–Bikaner Express
 Barmer–Guwahati Express
 Bikaner–Guwahati Express
 Howrah–Jodhpur Express
 Rajasthan Sampark Kranti Express
 Jodhpur–Delhi Sarai Rohilla Superfast Express
 Bandra Terminus–Hisar Superfast Express
 Mandore Express
 Ranthambore Express
 Jaipur–Jodhpur Intercity Express
 Marudhar Express
 Bhagat Ki Kothi–Mannargudi Weekly Express
 Puri–Jodhpur Express
 Leelan Express
 Salasar Express
 Bikaner–Bilaspur Antyodaya Express
 Anuvrat AC Superfast Express
 Visakhapatnam–Bhagat Ki Kothi Express
 Bikaner–Puri Express
 Bhagat Ki Kothi–Kamakhya Express

References

Railway stations in Nagaur district
Jodhpur railway division